Dasar is an acronym for Darkness Amplification by Stimulated Absorption of Radiation.

It is a little-used expression describing the anomalous interstellar formaldehyde absorption discovered by Palmer et al. in 1969.

See also
Astrophysical maser
Laser

Laser science